Andrés Felipe Correa (born 2 July 1984) is a Colombian professional footballer who plays as a defender for Once Caldas.

References

1984 births
Living people
Colombian footballers
People from Itagüí
Association football defenders
Atlético Junior footballers
Sportspeople from Antioquia Department